Walter R. Richards (January 10, 1904 – October 12, 1991) was an American football coach. He was a captain in the United States Coast Guard.

Coaching career
Richards was the head football coach at United States Coast Guard Academy in New London, Connecticut for four seasons, from 1926 to 1929, compiling a record of 7–17–3.

Richards was the head coach of the first victory of the football program at the Academy, a 45–0 victory over the Harvard junior varsity team.

Personal life
Richards was married to Esther Roberta Cooper (June 6, 1906 – April 24, 1982), whom he wed on November 14, 1925, at New London. Upon her death he survived her. He died in 1991 and was interred alongside his wife at Gardner Cemetery in New London.

Head coaching record

References

External links
 

1904 births
1991 deaths
Coast Guard Bears football coaches
United States Coast Guard captains